The Berchmanianum or Collegium Berchmanianum is a former college and residence of the Society of Jesus in the Brakkenstein district of Nijmegen, Netherlands.

History

Foundation
In 1923, the Catholic University of Nijmegen (renamed in 2004 as the Radboud University) was founded. In the following decade many religious orders built communities in the city for their members to be students or teachers in the new establishment.

In 1928, the Jesuits founded a college in the city, dedicated to John Berchmans. It opened in 1929 and the garden was built in 1930.

World War II
In 1942, during the occupation of the city, the Nazi Schutzstaffel demanded the building for the Lebensborn project. However, during their time there, no children were born. In September 1944, the building returned to the Jesuits who continued to study there. This lasted until 1967, when it became a home (till December 2016) for elderly Jesuits and men from other Catholic religious orders.

2018
In October 2018 Berchmanianum became the Academy Building for Radboud University Nijmegen. Berchmanianum houses the Executive Board of Radboud University, as well as a number of supporting services such as Administrative & Legal Affairs, International Office, Radboud Honours Academy and Student Affairs.

Exterior

See also
Society of Jesus
 List of Jesuit sites in the Netherlands

References

External links
 Academy Building Berchmanianum Radboud University

Jesuit universities and colleges
Educational institutions established in 1929
Catholic universities and colleges in the Netherlands
Education in Nijmegen
History of Nijmegen
Rijksmonuments in Nijmegen
Radboud University Nijmegen
1929 establishments in the Netherlands